The 9th Canadian Parliament was in session from February 6, 1901, until September 29, 1904.  The membership was set by the 1900 federal election on November 7, 1900. It was dissolved prior to the 1904 election.

It was controlled by a Liberal Party majority under Prime Minister Sir Wilfrid Laurier and the 8th Canadian Ministry.  The Official Opposition was the Conservative/Liberal-Conservative, led by Robert Borden.

The Speaker was first Louis Philippe Brodeur, and later Napoléon Antoine Belcourt.  See also List of Canadian electoral districts 1892-1903 for a list of the ridings in this parliament.

There were four sessions of the 9th Parliament.

List of members

Following is a full list of members of the ninth Parliament listed first by province, then by electoral district.

Electoral districts denoted by an asterisk (*) indicates that district was represented by two members.

British Columbia

Manitoba

New Brunswick

Northwest Territories

Nova Scotia

Ontario

Prince Edward Island

Quebec

Yukon

By-elections

References

Further reading

09th Canadian parliament
1901 establishments in Canada
1904 disestablishments in Canada
1901 in Canada
1902 in Canada
1903 in Canada
1904 in Canada